Strathfield Plaza is a shopping centre in Strathfield in the Inner West of Sydney, Australia. The centre is located on Churchill Avenue opposite  Strathfield railway station and is the largest shopping complex in the centre of Strathfield. It opened in 1981  and consists of a nine floor office tower, a single storey shopping centre, and a two level car park. It was the location of a mass shooting on 17 August 1991 known as the Strathfield massacre. The incident left eight dead (including the perpetrator) and six wounded.

Tenants 
The retailers include Woolworths, St.George Bank, and Australia Post.

Access and transport
Strathfield railway station is located next to Strathfield Plaza and is a major interchange station on the Sydney Trains network and is also a stop for trains on the NSW TrainLink network.

References

Shopping centres in Sydney
Shopping malls established in 1981
Municipality of Strathfield